Caenoscelis ferruginea is a species of silken fungus beetle in the family Cryptophagidae. It is found in Europe and Northern Asia (excluding China) and North America.

References

Further reading

External links

 

Cryptophagidae
Articles created by Qbugbot
Beetles described in 1820